Mary Lawrence (May 17, 1918September 24, 1991) was an American actress, who had a lengthy career in film and television. She was the wife of film director Delmer Daves.

She had a recurring role in the syndicated television series Casey Jones, where she played Jones' wife Alice with Alan Hale Jr. as her husband. Lawrence also appeared in episodes of The Bob Cummings Show, The Donna Reed Show, and Dragnet.

After she retired from acting, she turned to writing books on art.

Filmography

Bibliography

References

External links
 
 

1918 births
1991 deaths
20th-century American actresses
20th-century American non-fiction writers
20th-century American women writers
American art writers
American film actresses
American television actresses
American women non-fiction writers
Deaths from pneumonia in California
Western (genre) film actresses